The 2nd People's Choice Awards, honoring the best in popular culture for 1975, were held in 1976. They were broadcast on CBS.

Appearances

Jack Albertson
Henry Fonda
Tony Curtis
Burt Lancaster
Captain & Tennille
George Burns
Army Archerd
Bea Arthur
James Stewart
Rod Steiger
Roy Scheider
Summer Bartholomew
Lee Grant
Brenda Vaccaro
Henry Winkler
Bonnie Franklin
Gabe Kaplan
Raymond Burr
Ronee Blakley
Earl Holliman
James Brolin
Maximilian Schell
Glen Campbell
Sally Kellerman
Hal Linden
Karen Black
Olivia de Havilland
Ann-Margret
Robert Mitchum
Pam Grier
Kirk Douglas
George Burns
James Coburn
Morris Albert

Awards
Winners are listed first, in bold.

Movies

Television

Music

References

People's Choice Awards
1975 awards
1976 in American television
1975 awards in the United States
March 1976 events in the United States